Matthew Benjamin Amodio (born December 4, 1990) is an American game show contestant who won 38 consecutive games on the game show Jeopardy! in 2021, the third-longest streak in the show's history, behind Ken Jennings and Amy Schneider. A PhD student in computer science at Yale University, he won $1,519,601 in 39 appearances on Jeopardy!, making him the third millionaire contestant on the show in regular-season play. Across all American game shows, he is the eleventh highest-earning contestant of all time. His run on the show has been called the "Amodio Rodeo".

Early life and education
Born on December 4, 1990, Amodio is a native of Medina County, Ohio. He attended Medina High School where he graduated as valedictorian of the class of 2009. He graduated from Ohio State University in 2012 with a Bachelor of Science with Honors in Actuarial Science from the Department of Mathematics, while also earning a master's degree in Statistics. He also earned a Master's of Science (MS) degree in Artificial Intelligence from the University of Wisconsin - Madison in 2017. He received a PhD in Computer Science from Yale University.

After receiving degrees from The Ohio State University, Amodio worked for NSA contractor Booz Allen Hamilton from January 2014 until July 2015 "design[ing] and programm[ing] algorithms for machine learning applications," "construct[ing] interpretable network graph models from massive social media data," and "research[ing] algorithmic models and frameworks for graph analysis of IP networks."

Game show appearances

Academic Challenge
Amodio was a contestant on the quiz show Academic Challenge on WEWS in Cleveland, Ohio, while studying at Medina High School in 2009. Participating with two fellow students against two competing high schools, his Medina team finished in second place.

Jeopardy!
Amodio is the third-highest earner of all time in regular-season play, third-most successful in consecutive games won and fourth-biggest all-time winner. Amodio averaged $39,963 per victory, second highest all-time to James Holzhauer at $76,944. During season 37, Amodio qualified as the first seed in the next Tournament of Champions. He responded to 1,299 clues—54.6% of all of the clues given—correctly over the course of his run.

Actor Jonathan Fisher, originally from Coral Gables, Florida, who would himself amass an eleven-game winning streak, defeated Amodio in his 39th and final game. The episode originally aired October 11, 2021. Both appeared in the Jeopardy! Tournament of Champions that aired in November 2022 but did not play each other. Amodio lost to Sam Buttrey.

Production
To become a contestant on Jeopardy!, a prospect must successfully pass a test prepared by the production team as a first step in the audition process. Amodio was repeatedly encouraged by his father to take the online test. After taking the online test twice, Amodio was invited to personally audition for the show. In addition to the test results, the producers consider the personality of the prospective contestant; as an introvert, Amodio was concerned that he would not be interesting enough for the show.

Amodio's winning streak came during an interregnum in the show's hosting position after longtime host Alex Trebek died in November 2020, during which the show was helmed by guest hosts. Amodio's streak spanned episodes hosted by Robin Roberts, LeVar Burton, David Faber, and Joe Buck. Mike Richards was named permanent host on August 11, 2021, but lasted only one taping day (first week of season 38), and was replaced by interim host Mayim Bialik (who rotated the rest of season 38 with Ken Jennings, but Amodio's reign ended before Jennings' official term as host, as Jennings was the first host of the interregnum). As Jeopardy! tapes five episodes per production day, Amodio recorded his 39 episodes on nine separate days (three on his first day, one on his final day).  

Amodio played with his seventh different host during the Tournament of Champions, which featured Jennings.

Strategy
Amodio is noted for his strategy of consistently prefacing his responses with "What's" instead of adjusting the interrogative pronoun to fit the response. He chose this method because Jeopardy! rules allow any question containing the correct response to be used; by not having to adjust the pronoun, he has one less thing to think about when formulating a response, potentially speeding response time. He has credited Wikipedia's wikilinks format for allowing him to meander through various topics in a random but logical progression and learn content quickly.

Regular play winnings

See also
 List of notable Jeopardy! contestants
 Strategies and skills of Jeopardy! champions

References

External links
 J! Archive, Matt Amodio; A Ph.D. student from New Haven, Connecticut
 
 Twitter account

1990 births
Jeopardy! contestants
Living people
Mass media people from Ohio
Ohio State University alumni
University of Wisconsin–Madison College of Letters and Science alumni